Leepa is a village in Leepa Valley, Hattian Bala District of Azad Kashmir, Pakistan.

The village is accessible from Muzaffarabad by Muzaffarabad-Chakothi road  branches off at Naile which leads to Reshian. From Reshian the remaining  can be covered only by jeep.

History

Leepa has been a center of political activities from its earliest days. It is located in Jhelum Valley, district. The dominant surnames of the Leepa people are from different castes, including  Syed, Sheikh, Choudhry, Malik, Rajput, Awan, Mughal, Abbasi, Butt, Mir.

References

Populated places in Jhelum Valley District
Tehsils of Jhelum Valley District